Ivan Ruslanovych Pastukh (born 18 March 1998) is a Ukrainian professional footballer who plays as a centre-back.

References

External links
 Profile on Prykarpattia Ivano-Frankivsk official website
 
 

1998 births
Living people
People from Dolyna
Ukrainian footballers
Association football defenders
FC Naftovyk Dolyna players
FC Prykarpattia Ivano-Frankivsk (1998) players
Ukrainian First League players
Sportspeople from Ivano-Frankivsk Oblast